"Lullabye (Goodnight, My Angel)" is the seventh track  from Billy Joel's 1993 album River of Dreams released in 1994 as the fourth and final single for the album. It was inspired by Alexa Ray Joel, his daughter by Christie Brinkley. The song is in the key of G major.

The song was originally written as a prelude to the song "The River of Dreams" in the style of a monophonic Gregorian chant. Joel had written English words in the chant describing a man who had lost his faith, and had then had the words translated into Latin. He changed his mind upon hearing the recording, and incorporated it into the song "River of Dreams". He later removed the interlude from the final studio version of "River of Dreams", and instead wrote lyrics to the melody that reflected his sentiment toward Alexa Ray, who was a young child at the time of writing. The version of "River of Dreams" incorporating "Lullabye" appeared as an alternate version on the box set My Lives, and on An Evening of Questions and Answers...& a Little Music.

In 2004, it was announced that Joel had agreed to write two children's books for Scholastic, the U.S. publisher. The first book was titled Goodnight, My Angel (A Lullabye) and is a picture book based on the song and illustrated by Yvonne Gilbert. "Reassuring children that they are not alone or could be abandoned is very important for their well-being," Joel said in a statement in 2004. The second book was titled New York State of Mind and illustrated by Izak.

Critical reception
Dave Sholin from the Gavin Report described "Lullabye (Goodnight, My Angel)" as a "sweet and tender ballad that is bound to touch the hearts of all who hear it."

Personnel
Billy Joel: lead vocals, piano
Lewis Del Gatto: orchestra manager
Ira Newborn: orchestration

Charts

Weekly charts

Year-end charts

Certifications

References

1994 singles
Billy Joel songs
Songs written by Billy Joel
Columbia Records singles
Music videos directed by Marcus Nispel
Songs about parenthood
1993 songs